Florentino Domínguez Ordóñez (16 October 1962 — 27 December 2020) was a Mexican politician affiliated with the Institutional Revolutionary Party.

Biography
In 2014 he served as Deputy of the LIX Legislature of the Mexican Congress representing Tlaxcala.

Domínguez Ordóñez was Secretary of Public Education in Tlaxcala when he died from COVID-19 during the COVID-19 pandemic in Mexico, on 27 December 2020.

References

1962 births
2020 deaths
Politicians from Tlaxcala
Institutional Revolutionary Party politicians
People from Chiautempan
Autonomous University of Tlaxcala alumni
21st-century Mexican politicians
Deaths from the COVID-19 pandemic in Mexico
Members of the Chamber of Deputies (Mexico) for Tlaxcala